Nenu Premisthunnanu is a 1997 Indian Telugu-language Romance film, directed by E. V. V. Satyanarayana. The film stars J.D Chakravarthy and Rachana. The film was a remake of Malayalam film Aniyathipravu.

Plot summary
Chakri and Rachana fall in love and decide to elope. However, they soon regret their choice and return to convince their parents to accept them.

Cast 

 J. D. Chakravarthy as Chakri
 Rachna Banerjee as Rachana 
 Sarath Babu as Rachana's brother
 Srividya
 Srihari as Rachana's brother
 Chalapathi Rao as Rachana's brother
 Brahmanandam
 Besant Ravi
 Kaikala Satyanarayana
 Venu as Chaktri's friend
 PRakash as Chakri's friend
 Ganesh as Chakri's friend

Soundtrack 
The song "Kovello Deepama" was reused from composer Sirpy's own Tamil song "Devan Koil" from Naan Pesa Ninaipathellam while "Prema Devinchuma" was reused from composer's another Tamil song "Kadhal Illathathu" from Mani Rathnam.

Reception 
The film was reviewed by Zamin Ryot. A critic from Andhra Today opined that the film was "an entertainer right through" and added that "The story moves fast without a dull moment".

References

External links

1998 films
1990s Telugu-language films
1990s romance films
Films directed by E. V. V. Satyanarayana
Telugu remakes of Malayalam films
Super Good Films films